Thomas Ralph Schoen (born 1945 or 1946 – January 31, 2023) was an American football defensive back who played one season with the Cleveland Browns of the National Football League. He was drafted by the Browns in the eighth round of the 1968 NFL Draft. He played college football at the University of Notre Dame, where he was a Consensus All-American in 1967.

Early years
Schoen played quarterback at St. Joseph High School in Cleveland, Ohio and led the team to a 9–0–1 record his senior year, earning All-Ohio honors.

College career
Schoen joined Notre Dame as a quarterback before being converted to safety his junior and senior seasons. He was a Consensus All-American in 1967.

Professional career
Schoen was drafted by the Cleveland Browns in the eighth round, with the 212th pick, of the 1968 NFL Draft. He did not play until 1970 because of military service.

While in the military as quarterback, Schoen led the 7th Infantry Division football team to an undefeated 8th Army championship. He was stationed at Fort Campbell, Kentucky in 1969 as a private first class. He also served in South Korea in 1969.

Coaching career
Schoen returned to St. Joseph High School to become assistant football coach in 1988. He was named head coach in 1995 and became the school's athletic director in 1998.

Personal life
Schoen died on January 31, 2023.

References

External links
Just Sports Stats
College stats

1946 births
2023 deaths
Players of American football from Cleveland
American football defensive backs
Notre Dame Fighting Irish football players
Cleveland Browns players
All-American college football players
United States Army soldiers
American military sports players